The 1998 Great Yarmouth Borough Council election took place on 7 May 1998 to elect members of Great Yarmouth Borough Council in Norfolk, England. One third of the council was up for election and the Labour Party stayed in overall control of the council.

After the election, the composition of the council was:
Labour 36
Conservative 12

Election result

References

1998 English local elections
1998
20th century in Norfolk